John Allen Veatch (5 March 180824 April 1870), a surgeon, surveyor, and scientist, was known for his discovery of large deposits of borax at Tuscan Springs, California, on 8 January 1856.

Veatch moved with his family to Texas in 1833, where he surveyed for the Mexican government. He received two land grants in 1835, one located in what would become Beaumont, Texas, and another near the future Sour Lake, Texas. After the Texas Revolution, where he served as a surgeon, Veatch moved to California, where he discovered borax in Lake County, California. Veatch eventually ended up in Oregon, where he taught at the Willamette University College of Medicine.

References

(page 23) Who Was Who in America 1967

Scientists from California
1808 births
1870 deaths